Francesco Pietro Stradella (12 May 1941 – 25 October 2022) was an Italian businessman and politician. A member of Forza Italia and later The People of Freedom, he served in the Chamber of Deputies from 1996 to 2013.

Stradella died in Quargnento on 25 October 2022, at the age of 81.

References

1941 births
2022 deaths
Forza Italia politicians
The People of Freedom politicians
Deputies of Legislature XIII of Italy
Deputies of Legislature XIV of Italy
Deputies of Legislature XV of Italy
Deputies of Legislature XVI of Italy
20th-century Italian politicians
21st-century Italian politicians
People from the Province of Alessandria